Sophie Drakeford-Lewis (born 10 December 1998) is an English netball player who plays for Surrey Storm and has represented the national team. She has previously played for Saracens Mavericks and Team Bath, and was awarded the Young Player of the Season Award for the 2019 Netball Superleague season. As a youngster, Drakeford-Lewis played tennis, and she was at one time the highest ranked Briton at under-16 and under-18 level.

Early life
Drakeford-Lewis attended The Abbey School, Reading. As a youngster, Drakeford-Lewis played tennis. Aged 14, Drakeford-Lewis won the HSBC Road to Wimbledon National 14 and Under Challenge Finals competition, and at the age of 15, she was the highest ranked Briton at under-16 and under-18 level. She studied Integrated Mechanical & Electrical Engineering at the University of Bath, and graduated in 2021.

Club career
Drakeford-Lewis started playing netball in Woodley, Berkshire. She plays as a goal attack or wing attack. She started her playing career in 2017 at Hertfordshire Mavericks (now Saracens Mavericks), and was nominated for the Netball Superleague Young Player of the Season. In total, she scored 283 goals for Mavericks. In 2018, Drakeford-Lewis started playing for Team Bath. She resigned for the club for the 2019 season. That year, was awarded the Young Player of the Season Award, and she continued with Team Bath for the 2020 season. In November 2020, Drakeford-Lewis confirmed that she would play for Bath in the 2021 season, and in October 2021, she was named in the Bath squad for the 2022 season.

Ahead of the 2023 Netball Superleague season , Drakeford-Lewis signed for Surrey Storm.

International career
Drakeford-Lewis has represented the England under-17s team. She played for England under-21s at the 2017 Netball World Youth Cup, where they finished third overall. 

She made her debut for the senior team in a 2017 European Netball Championship match against Fiji. Her next appearance for England was during the 2019 England netball team tour of South Africa. She played all three matches in the 2020 Taini Jamison Trophy Series against New Zealand, scoring 23 of her 27 attempts at goal in the series. She also played in the 2021 Taini Jamison Trophy Series against New Zealand, and the 2021 Vitality Roses Reunited Series against Jamaica. In December 2021, she was named in the England squad for the 2022 Netball Quad Series. Drakeford-Lewis was included in the England squad for the netball event at the 2022 Commonwealth Games.

Notes

References

External links
 Netball Superleague Profile
 

1998 births
Living people
English netball players
Team Bath netball players
English female tennis players
Mavericks netball players
Alumni of the University of Bath
Netball players at the 2022 Commonwealth Games
Netball Superleague players